Synthesis or synthesize may refer to:

Science

Chemistry and biochemistry 
Chemical synthesis, the execution of chemical reactions to form a more complex molecule from chemical precursors
Organic synthesis, the chemical synthesis of organic compounds
Total synthesis, the complete organic synthesis of complex organic compounds, usually without the aid of biological processes
Convergent synthesis or linear synthesis, a strategy to improve the efficiency of multi-step chemical syntheses
Dehydration synthesis, a chemical synthesis resulting in the loss of a water molecule
Biosynthesis, the creation of an organic compound in a living organism, usually aided by enzymes
Photosynthesis, a biochemical reaction using a carbon molecule to produce an organic molecule, using sunlight as a catalyst
Chemosynthesis, the synthesis of biological compounds into organic waste, using methane or an oxidized molecule as a catalyst
Amino acid synthesis, the synthesis of an amino acid from its constituents
Peptide synthesis, the biochemical synthesis of peptides using amino acids
Protein biosynthesis, the multi-step biochemical synthesis of proteins (long peptides)
DNA synthesis, several biochemical processes for making DNA
DNA replication, DNA biosynthesis in vivo
Synthesis (cell cycle)
RNA synthesis, the synthesis of RNA from nucleic acids, using another nucleic acid chain as a template
ATP synthesis, the biochemical synthesis of ATP

Physics
Nucleosynthesis, the process of creating new atomic nuclei from pre-existing nucleons
Kinematic synthesis, part of the process of designing a machine to achieve its objective

Electronics 
Logic synthesis, the process of converting a higher-level form of a design into a lower-level implementation
High-level synthesis, an automated design process that interprets an algorithmic description of a desired behavior and creates hardware that implements that behavior
Frequency synthesizer, an electronic system for generating any of a range of frequencies

Speech and sound creation 
Sound synthesis, various methods of sound generation in audio electronics
Wave field synthesis, a spatial audio rendering technique, characterized by creation of virtual acoustic environments
Subtractive synthesis, a method of creating a sound by removing harmonics, characterised by the application of an audio filter to an audio signal
Frequency modulation synthesis, a form of audio synthesis where the timbre of a simple waveform is changed by frequency modulating it with a modulating frequency that is also in the audio range
Speech synthesis, the artificial production of human speech

Humanities 
In philosophy, the end result of a dialectic, as in thesis, antithesis, synthesis
A cognitive skill, in Benjamin Bloom's Taxonomy of Educational Objectives
In philosophy and science, a higher a priori process than analysis
in linguistics, a scale denoting the average ratio of morphemes to words; see synthetic language

Other uses 
Synthesis anarchism, a form of anarchist organization which tries to join anarchists of different tendencies
Synthesis (clothing), a garment or outfit worn in ancient Rome for dining or special occasions
Synthesis (Evanescence album), 2017
Synthesis (The Cryan' Shames album), 1968
Synthesis (journal), a journal of chemical synthesis
Program synthesis, a task in computer science to automatically generate programs from a formal specification

See also
Analysis, the converse of synthesis
Carlson Curve
Synthesizer (disambiguation)
Synthetic (disambiguation)
Creation (disambiguation)
Formation (disambiguation)
Production (disambiguation)
Derivation (disambiguation)